Hiroshima Expressway may refer to:
 Hiroshima Expressway (urban expressway), a Japanese urban expressway
 Hiroshima Expressway (West Nippon Expressway Company), a Japanese expressway operated by the West Nippon Expressway Company